Gopalpur Union is an Union parishad of Kachua Upazila, Bagerhat District in Khulna Division of Bangladesh. It has an area of 20.72 km2 (8.00 sq mi) and a population of 14,246.

References

Unions of Kachua Upazila
Unions of Bagerhat District
Unions of Khulna Division